The R536 is a Regional Route in South Africa.

Route
Its western terminus is the R37 just east of the Long Tom Pass between Mashishing (Lydenburg) and Nelspruit in Mpumalanga. Heading east, the road quickly reaches Sabie where the R532 is given off heading north. Shortly after leaving the town to the east, the R536 gives off the R537 to the south. It continues east reaching Hazyview where it is briefly cosigned with the R40 going south, before continuing east till it ends at the Paul Kruger Gate of Kruger National Park.

References

Regional Routes in Mpumalanga